The Journal of Asthma & Allergy Educators was a bimonthly peer-reviewed medical journal that covered research in the fields of pulmonary disorders and allergy, especially asthma, allergy management, and patient education. The editor-in-chief was Concettina Tolomeo (Yale School of Medicine). The journal was established in 2010 and published until December 2013 by SAGE Publications in association with the Association of Asthma Educators.

Abstracting and indexing
The journal was abstracted and indexed in Scopus.

References

External links

SAGE Publishing academic journals
English-language journals
Immunology journals
Bimonthly journals
Publications established in 2010
Publications disestablished in 2013
Defunct journals of the United States